Buti is an Italian surname. Notable people with the name include:

 Arianna Buti, elected mayor of Buti, Tuscany in 2021, defeating the unrelated Monia Buti
 Bimla Buti (born 1933), Indian physicist
 Buti Manamela, South African politician
 Carlo Buti (1902–1963), Italian interpreter of popular and folk music
 Caterina Buti del Vacca, possible mother of Leonardo da Vinci
Lateefa Buti, Kuwaiti writer
 Lucrezia Buti (1435-?), Italian nun
 Ludovico Buti (1560–1611), Italian painter
 Ramadan al-Buti, also known as Muhammad Said Ramadan al-Bouti, Muslim scholar
 Simone Buti (born 1983), Italian volleyball player
 Tony Buti (born 1961), Australian politician

See also
Buti, Tuscany, a village in Italy
Buti (given name)

Italian-language surnames